The 1964 Guerrero earthquake occurred on July 6 at  in Guerrero, Mexico. The magnitude of this earthquake was given as Ms 7.4, or ML 7.2.

Tectonic setting
In the nearby region, the Cocos Plate is subducting beneath the North American Plate, however, this was an intraplate earthquake.

Earthquake
The earthquake affected the states of Guerrero and Michoacán. Forty deaths were reported. The most affected places included Ciudad Altamirano, Cutzamala, Coyuca de Catalán, Tanganhuato, and Huertamo. The earthquake was also felt strongly and caused panic in Mexico City.

Damage
Coyuca de Catalán was seriously damaged. The city hall was destroyed. The majority of the houses there were seriously damaged and became uninhabitable. There were great cracks on the ground.

See also
List of earthquakes in 1964
List of earthquakes in Mexico

References

External links

Guerrero earthquake, 1964
1964 Guerrero earthquake
1964 in Mexico
1964 disasters in Mexico